The Sporting d'Hiver was a historic building in Monaco. It was built in 1932 and demolished in 2015. Designed in the Beaux Arts architectural style, it was "once used to host glamorous parties and exhibitions for the world's high society".

History
The building was completed in 1932. It was designed in the Beaux Arts architectural style. The building was "once used to host glamorous parties and exhibitions for the world's high society". By 1974, most society events had moved to the newly built Monte-Carlo Sporting in the Larvotto district. In recent years, the Sporting d'Hiver was home to a cinema, SBM offices, and stores.

In 2008, Albert II, Prince of Monaco authorized the Société des bains de mer de Monaco (SBM) to demolish it and erect postmodern buildings instead. Many Monegasque subjects and residents objected to the demolition, including Laurent Nouvion, who serves as the president of the National Council. The building came down in June 2015.

A new building, designed in the postmodern architectural style by Richard Rogers, is in the works.

References

Event venues in Monaco
Buildings and structures completed in 1932
Buildings and structures demolished in 2015